In law, a ward is a minor or incapacitated adult placed under the protection of a legal guardian or government entity, such as a court. Such a person may be referenced as a "ward of the court".

Overview
The wardship jurisdiction is an ancient jurisdiction derived from the British Crown's duty as parens patriae ("parent of the nation") to protect his or her subjects, and particularly those unable to look after themselves. In the United Kingdom and other Commonwealth realms, the monarch as parens patriae is parent for all the children in their realms, who, if a judge so determines, can become wards of court. However, the House of Lords, in the case of Re F (Mental Patient: Sterilisation), held that the Queen has no parens patriae jurisdiction with regard to mentally disabled adults. A court may take responsibility for the legal protection of an incapacitated person as well a minor, and the ward is known as a ward of the court or a ward of the state.

In Australia, New Zealand, and the United States, the child is termed a ward of the court. In Ireland and the United Kingdom "the" is not used; the ward is thus termed a ward of court. In Canada the legal term is permanent ward, except in Ontario, which uses the term Crown ward.

Foster care
Children who are in the custody of government departments, also known as foster care, become wards of the respective government entity, and in the US they are wards of the states in which they reside. The government or state is in loco parentis to the child, which generally entails supporting the child and assuming all legal authority to make medical and legal decisions on the child's behalf.

Canada
The indigenous peoples in Canada remain wards of the Crown as a result of Indian Act legislation. Some scholars and political organizations, such as the Assembly of First Nations, have argued that this represents an apartheid-like system of governance.

France

In France, a ward of the State is a minor who is under the responsibility of the State.

Children recognized as wards of the state are eligible for adoption, and continue to be wards until they are.

United States
In the Supreme Court case Cherokee Nation v. Georgia, the native peoples were legally made to be wards of the state. One consequence of this was that they were not permitted to sue the US government because of their status as a dependent nation.

The Indian Appropriations Act was passed on 3 March 1871, with an amendment ending tribal recognition and the treaty system. All Indians were made wards of the state; thus the U.S. government no longer needed tribal consent in dealing with the tribes.

In California, a juvenile offender may be ordered to be a ward of a court if such juvenile violated any state law, curfew, or from excessive truancies since the juvenile criminal justice system in California is geared toward rehabilitation instead of punishment.

See also
 Charge (youth)
 Godchild
 Court of Wards and Liveries
 Government involvement in the Terri Schiavo case
 History of the English fiscal system
 Proof of age inquisition
 Tenant-in-chief - relating to medieval feudal wardships

References

Family law legal terminology
Family law
Common law legal terminology

sv:Myndling